Friedrich von Westhoff (Lübeck, 1611 - Dresden, 1694) was a Swedish officer who remained in Germany and became a trombonist at the Dresden court. His son Johann Paul von Westhoff (b. 1656) became a distinguished pupil of Heinrich Schütz (d. 1672).

References

1611 births
1694 deaths
Swedish trombonists
Swedish military officers
German trombonists
Male trombonists
Musicians from Lübeck
Pupils of Heinrich Schütz